Josef (also Jozef, sometimes Zhozef) Yakovlevich Kotin (10 March 1908, Pavlohrad – 21 October 1979, Leningrad) was a Soviet armored vehicle design engineer, Head of all three Leningrad armor design bureaux (1937–39), Chief Designer of the Narkomat for Tank Industry (1939-1941), Deputy Narkom for the tank industry of the Soviet Union (1941-1943), Director of the VNII-100 Research Institute at Kirov Plant, Deputy Defense Industry Minister of the Soviet Union 1968–1972. He is best known for leading the design of some of the Kliment Voroshilov tanks, IS tank family, T-10 tank, SU-152 self-propelled heavy howitzer, Kirovets K-700 tractor and many other armored vehicles and heavy machinery.

He received the title of Hero of Socialist Labour (1941) and four Stalin Prizes (1941, 1943, 1946 and 1948). He was married to Nataliya Poklonova, who was an engineer with the RKKA UMM (Soviet army office of motorization and Mechanization).

References 

1908 births
1979 deaths
20th-century Russian engineers
People from Pavlohrad
People from Yekaterinoslav Governorate
Communist Party of the Soviet Union members
Academic staff of Peter the Great St. Petersburg Polytechnic University
Second convocation members of the Supreme Soviet of the Soviet Union
Sixth convocation members of the Supreme Soviet of the Soviet Union
Heroes of Socialist Labour
Stalin Prize winners
Recipients of the Order of Lenin
Recipients of the Order of the Red Banner
Recipients of the Order of the Red Banner of Labour
Recipients of the Order of the Red Star
Recipients of the Order of Suvorov, 1st class
Recipients of the Order of Suvorov, 2nd class
Tank designers
Russian colonel generals
Russian mechanical engineers
Soviet colonel generals
Soviet mechanical engineers
Burials at Novodevichy Cemetery